A sunken road is a road that is lower than the land on either side.

Sunken road or Sunken Road may also refer to:
Sunken Road, the location of the most intense combat at the Battle of Antietam
Sunken Road (Shiloh), a feature of the "Hornet's Nest" at the Battle of Shiloh
Sunken road (obstacle), a type of obstacle used in horse jumping and equestrian competitions